The 134th Pennsylvania House of Representatives District is located in Southeastern Pennsylvania and has been represented since 2023 by Peter Schweyer.

District profile
The 134th Pennsylvania House of Representatives District is located in Lehigh County. It includes the following areas:

 Allentown (PART)
 Ward 02
 Ward 03
 Ward 11 [PART, Divisions 01 and 03]
 Ward 12
 Ward 13 [PART, Divisions 01, 02 and 03]
 Ward 16
 Ward 19
 Emmaus
 Salisbury Township (PART, Wards 04 and 05)

Representatives

Recent election results

References

External links
District map from the United States Census Bureau
Pennsylvania House Legislative District Maps from the Pennsylvania Redistricting Commission.
Population Data for District 134 from the Pennsylvania Redistricting Commission.

Government of Berks County, Pennsylvania
Government of Lehigh County, Pennsylvania
134